Kampfar is a black metal band from Fredrikstad, Norway. According to their singer, Dolk, their name is an ancient Norse battle cry which means Odin or Wotan. The music of Kampfar can be described as black metal inspired by Norwegian folklore and nature. The band is currently signed to Indie Recordings.

History
Kampfar was formed by Dolk in 1994 when he left his former band, Mock, and was joined by Thomas. Two years later the duo released their first self-titled EP. This was followed by the release of the band's first full-length album Mellom skogkledde aaser in 1997. The band released their second album Fra underverdenen in 1999; the album is significant for featuring the song "Norse", which was the band's first song written in English, as opposed to their other songs which were written in the Norwegian language. The song was also featured on the band's second EP Norse, released in 1998. The sound on Fra Underverdenen moved away from some of the folk aspects that were featured on band's past releases and concentrated more on Thomas' fondness for classical music. Following the release of Fra Underverdenen, Kampfar was put on hold. The band became active again during 2003, when they were joined by the bass player Jon Bakker and drummer and vocalist Ask. Despite the creation of new lineup, the band did not perform live until 2004. The band made their first appearance at the Moshfest festival in Halden, not far from their hometown Fredrikstad. Their 2006 album Kvass was recorded between November 2005 and January 2006 with producer Rune Jørgensen in Silvertone Studio in Gamle Fredrikstad. The band used the same studio and producer again for Heimgang in 2008.

In 2010 Kampfar went to the famous Abyss Studio in Sweden to record their next album Mare with producer Peter Tägtgren. Long serving guitarist Thomas quit the band even before the album was released and was replaced by Ole (Mistur, Emancer) for the upcoming live shows. Ole later joined the band permanently and Kampfar went on to tour Norway, North America and Europe twice to support the album.

In 2013 the band went back to Abyss Studio to record their sixth studio album Djevelmakt, this time working with Jonas Kjellgren as producer and Peter Tägtgren doing the mixing. Djevelmakt was released worldwide 27 January 2014.

A little more than a year later, on 13 November 2015, the band released their seventh full-length album Profan. The album was given Norway's 2015 Spellemann Award for best metal album of the year.

On 3 May 2019, Kampfar released their eighth album, Ofidians Manifest. This album was nominated for the 2019 Spellemann Award in the metal category.

Discography
Studio albums
 Mellom skogkledde aaser (Malicious Records 1997, re-release Napalm Records 2006)
 Fra underverdenen (Hammerheart Records 1999, re-release Napalm Records 2006)
 Kvass (Napalm Records 2006)
 Heimgang (Napalm Records 2008)
 Mare (Napalm Records 2011)
 Djevelmakt (Indie Recordings 2014)
 Profan (Indie Recordings 2015)
 Ofidians Manifest (2019)
 Til klovers takt (2022)
Singles and EPs
 Promo (demo, 1995)
 Kampfar (EP, 1996)
 Norse (EP, 1998)
 Mylder (single, 2013)
 Swarm Norvegicus (single, 2014)
 Icons (single, 2015)
 Tornekratt (single, 2016)
 Ophidian (single, 2019)
 Syndefall (single, 2019)
 Lausdans Under Stjernene (single, 2022)
 Urkraft (single, 2022)

Members

Current members
 Dolk (Per Joar Spydevold) — vocals (1994–present), drums (1994–2003)
 Ask (Ask Ty Ulvhedin Bergli Arctander) — vocals, drums (2003–present)
 Ole (Ole Hartvigsen) — guitar (2011–present)
 Jon (Jon Bakker) — bass (2003–present)

Former Member
 Thomas (Thomas Andreassen) — guitar (1994–2010), bass (1994–2003)

Timeline

Equipment
 ESP Guitars & Basses
 EMG Pickups
 ENGL Powerball
 Blackstar Unity
 Rotosound strings (Drop D tuning)
 Shure GLX-D Wireless
 Paiste Cymbals
 Richter straps
 Darkglass effects

References

External links

Official website
Kampfar at My Space
Facebook

Norwegian black metal musical groups
Musical groups established in 1994
1994 establishments in Norway
Musical quartets
Musical groups from Fredrikstad
Norwegian folk metal musical groups
Napalm Records artists
Season of Mist artists